Samuel Gabriel Costa (17 June 1910 – 23 September 1981) was an English singer, entertainer and broadcaster.  Initially a popular singer in the dance band era and a comic actor on the show Much-Binding-in-the-Marsh, he was later a disc jockey for Radio Luxembourg and the BBC.

Life and career
Costa was born in Stoke Newington, London, the son of journalist Gabriel Costa and Annie (née Sawer), and was of Sephardic Jewish-Portuguese ancestry — Costa is a  Jewish Portuguese surname.

Sam Costa began his career as a pianist with Bert Firman's band.  He later became a popular British dance band singer in the 1930s making many records with bands such as Jack Jackson, Lew Stone, Harry Leader, Maurice Winnick and Jay Wilbur.    After his crooning days, his BBC radio career began in 1939 with the It's That Man Again (ITMA) shows with Tommy Handley, in which he took the part of Lemuel the office boy.   He then worked with Kenneth Horne, Richard Murdoch and Maurice Denham in Much-Binding-in-the-Marsh. 

In 1950, he started hosting Record Rendezvous on the BBC, and also hosted The Sam Costa Show on Radio Luxembourg.  On Sundays he did both Breakfast Time and Glamorous Nights and he also presented  Housewives' Choice  and Midday Spin, transitioning to BBC Radio 2 from 1967. On BBC Radio 2 he had various shows; morning, lunchtime, afternoon, early evening, and late night.   Costa would sign off saying "Thank you for the pleasure of your company".  

On Radio Luxembourg in the early 1960s, he hosted an hour-long show sponsored by Guards Cigarettes.   Along with Kenneth Horne, Costa also appeared in an episode of The Men from the Ministry which co-starred Richard Murdoch.   While he generally disliked TV work, Costa did appear on several Juke Box Jury shows. In 1964 he linked a musical short film, Just for You which featured some prominent “pop” bands of the day, including The Applejacks and Freddie and the Dreamers. Costa was also a regular on David Frost's Frost on Sunday in 1970.  

He married Esther Comer in 1938; they were married for over 40 years.  Sam Costa died in London in 1981.

Filmography
 A Piece of Cake (1948)
 Trouble in the Air (1948)
 One Wild Oat (1951)
 The Pickwick Papers (1952)
 Just For You (1964)

References

Further reading
 Obituary, Jewish Chronicle, 2 October 1981
R2OK! Radio 2 Preservation Society and Radio 2 Timeline Project (2007)
This England's Second Book of British Dance Bands (2001).
British Dance Bands On Record 2nd Ed. (1989) by Brian Rust and Sandy Forbes.

External links 

1910 births
1981 deaths
British male television actors
British male radio actors
British Sephardi Jews
British people of Portuguese-Jewish descent
British radio people
20th-century English male actors
20th-century British  male singers
BBC Radio 2 presenters